Gladson de Lima Cameli (born March 26, 1978) is a Brazilian politician and engineer. He has represented Acre in the Federal Senate since 2015. Previously, he was a deputy from Acre from 2007 to 2015. He is a member of the Progressive Party. He has been implicated in the Petrobras scandal.

Cameli is the governor of Acre, having been elected in the first round of the 2018 election.

Biography
Gladson Cameli, son of Eládio Messias Cameli and Maria Lindomar de Lima Cameli, attended elementary school at Escola São José, in Cruzeiro do Sul, his hometown, between 1985 and 1992. In Manaus, he attended high school at Instituto Batista do Amazonas (IBA), completed in 1995. At the age of 19, he was trained in fluency in English by the EF International School of English, in the UK, and started a course in Civil Engineering at the Lutheran Institute of Higher Education in Manaus, completed in 2001. 
Married to lawyer Ana Paula Correia da Silva Cameli and father of Guilherme Correia Cameli, Gladson became a partner at Marmud Cameli Cia Ltda, his family's company, in 1997. In addition, the former senator also served as Technical Responsible of Construtora ETAM Ltda of Manaus in 2005.

Political career
Gladson Cameli, a member of the Municipal Youth Council, joined the PFL during (2000-2003) and the PPS during (2003-2005). However, he began his political trajectory at the age of 28 as a member of the PP, in which he joined in 2005, elected for the first time to the mandate of federal deputy (2007-2011) with 18,886 votes. In the 2010 elections, he was re-elected as deputy (2011-2015) with more than 30 thousand votes. In October 2009, he was awarded the title of Citizen Rio Branquense by the City Council of Rio Branco / AC. In 2014, during the electoral campaign, two of the three polls released by Ibope in Acre pointed to Gladson Cameli's victory. On the election date, Gladson achieved victory for the senatorial position, with about 218,756 votes. However, the then-senator-elect did not complete his term in the legislature, being licensed to exercise the post of governor of the state of Acre after the 2018 elections, in which he already won in the first round over candidates Marcus Alexandre (PT), Colonel Ulysses (PSL), Janaína Furtado (Rede) and David Hall (Avante). Gladson Cameli's victory breaks the existing PT hegemony in the state of Acre for about 20 years.
In 2016, the then senator voted in favor of the Impeachment of Dilma Rousseff and the PEC on the Ceiling of Public Spending. Gladson also voted in favor of labor reform in July 2017, and stood against Aécio Neves' impeachment on the Senate's ethics board. Cameli's political career is marked by family political heritage, as he is the nephew of former state governor Orleir Cameli, who died in 2013, who ruled between 1995 and 1999.

References

Living people
1978 births
Members of the Federal Senate (Brazil)
Governors of Acre (state)
Members of the Chamber of Deputies (Brazil) from Acre
Progressistas politicians
People from Acre (state)